Tarh va Toseh Sabz Alvand Futsal Club was an Iranian futsal club based in Alvand.

History 
The club was founded in August 2016 in Alvand, and they competed in the Iranian Futsal Super League. In their first season the club finished in second last place and was relegated to the 1st Division.

Season-by-season 
The table below chronicles the achievements of the Club in various competitions.

References 

Futsal clubs in Iran
Sport in Qazvin
Futsal clubs established in 2016
2016 establishments in Iran